Qerkhlar or Qarkhlar or Qerekhlar may refer to:
 Qerkhlar, East Azerbaijan
 Qerkhlar, Hamadan
 Qerekhlar, Kurdistan